Westmoreland County is a county located in the Northern Neck of the Commonwealth of Virginia. As of the 2020 census, the population sits at 18,477. Its county seat is Montross.

History 

As originally established by the  Virginia colony's House of Burgesses, this area was separated from  Northumberland County in 1653 and named for the English county of Westmorland; both counties are coastal. The territory of Westmoreland County encompassed much of what later became the various counties and cities of Northern Virginia, including the city of Alexandria,  Arlington County, Fairfax County, and Prince William County. These areas comprised part of Westmoreland until the formation of Stafford County in 1664.

Westmoreland County on Northern Neck was the birthplace of George Washington, who later became the first President of the United States (born at the former settlement of Bridges Creek, Virginia); of James Monroe, the fifth President; and of Robert E. Lee, general and commander of the  Confederate armies during the American Civil War of 1861-1865.

Colonel Nicholas Spencer (1633-1689) resided in this county. He  patented the land at Mount Vernon in 1674 with his friend Lt. Col. John Washington, ancestor of George Washington. Spencer, who served as President of  the Council and acting  Governor (in office: 1683-1684) of the Colony of Virginia, was the cousin of, and agent for, the Barons Colepeper,  proprietors of the Northern Neck. Spencer lived at his plantation, Nomini, which his descendants later sold to Robert Carter I (1662/63 – 1732) .

Robert Carter's grandson, Robert Carter III, is known for voluntarily freeing almost 500 slaves from Nomini Hall, beginning in 1791. He also provided for their settlement on land that he bought for them in  Ohio territory. This manumission was the largest known release of slaves in North America prior to the American Civil War and involved the largest number ever manumitted by an individual in the U.S.

Geography

Located on the Northern Neck, the county is within the Northern Neck George Washington Birthplace AVA winemaking appellation.

Adjacent counties
 Charles County, Maryland - north
 St. Mary's County, Maryland - northeast
 Northumberland County, Virginia - southeast
 Richmond County, Virginia - south
 Essex County, Virginia - southwest
 King George County, Virginia - northwest

National protected areas
 George Washington Birthplace National Monument
 Rappahannock River Valley National Wildlife Refuge (part) Mothershead unit

Demographics

2020 census

Note: the US Census treats Hispanic/Latino as an ethnic category. This table excludes Latinos from the racial categories and assigns them to a separate category. Hispanics/Latinos can be of any race.

2000 Census
At the 2000 census, there were 16,718 people, 6,846 households and 4,689 families residing in the county. The racial makeup of the county was 65.41% White, 30.89% Black or African American, 0.28% Native American, 0.36% Asian, 0.01% Pacific Islander, 1.75% from other races, and 1.29% from two or more races. 3.46% of the population were Hispanic or Latino of any race.

There were 6,846 households, of which 25.70% had children under the age of 18 living with them, 50.70% were married couples living together, 13.50% had a female householder with no husband present, and 31.50% were non-families. 26.90% of all households were made up of individuals, and 13.60% had someone living alone who was 65 years of age or older. The average household size was 2.43 and the average family size was 2.91.

23.00% of the population were under the age of 18, 6.30% from 18 to 24, 23.90% from 25 to 44, 27.80% from 45 to 64, and 19.00% who were 65 years of age or older. The median age was 43 years. For every 100 females, there were 92.30 males. For every 100 females age 18 and over, there were 88.90 males.

The median household income was $35,797 and the median family income was $41,357. Males had a median income of $31,333 and females $22,221. The per capita income was $19,473. About 11.20% of families and 14.70% of the population were below the poverty line, including 21.10% of those under age 18 and 12.50% of those age 65 or over.

Economy 
The county's economy is largely based on agriculture. Tourism is another significant economic driver, related to historical sites such as George Washington Birthplace National Monument and Robert E. Lee's birthplace, Stratford Hall Plantation, and the Westmoreland County Museum as well as gambling activities available in Colonial Beach. The county is also an extended exurb of Washington, D.C.

Northern Neck Coca-Cola Bottling Inc. (makers of Northern Neck Ginger Ale) and the weekly Westmoreland News are located in Montross.

Notable residents 

 Laetitia Corbin Lee (1657–1706), American colonist
 George Washington (1732-1799), the first president of the United States
 John Washington (1631-1677), great-grandfather of George Washington
 Bushrod Washington (1762-1829), Associate Justice of the Supreme Court, founder and first president of the American Colonization Society, nephew of George Washington and inheritor of Mount Vernon
 James Monroe (1758-1831), the fifth president of the United States
 Robert E. Lee (1807-1870), a general best known for fighting on behalf of the Confederate Army in the American Civil War
 Richard Henry Lee, a signatory of the United States Declaration of Independence, United States Senator, and the sixth president of the United States in Congress Assembled (under the Articles of Confederation)
 Francis Lightfoot Lee, a signer of the United States Declaration of Independence
 Richard "Squire" Lee, prominent Virginian colonist and American politician
 Thomas Brown, the second governor of Florida
 Nicholas Spencer, acting governor of Virginia, co-patentee of Mount Vernon estate
 Thomas Lee, a leading political figure in colonial Virginia
 Nathaniel Rochester, founder of Rochester, New York
 Thomas Sandford, American Revolutionary War soldier, Kentucky legislator , Member of the Eighth and Ninth U.S. Congress.
 Sloan Wilson, the author of The Man in the Gray Flannel Suit
 Rob Wittman, United States Congressman (VA-1, Republican)
 Thomas Marshall (1700-1752) Grandfather of Chief Justice John Marshall
 Walter Balderson, Emmy Award-winning video engineer
 John dos Passos, the author of the U.S.A. trilogy and other works

Communities

Towns
 Colonial Beach
 Montross

Politics
Westmoreland County is a notable bellwether for U.S. presidential politics, having voted for the winner in every election since 1928 except 1948, 1960, and 2020.

See also
 George Washington Birthplace National Monument
 History of Popes Creek, Virginia
 National Register of Historic Places listings in Westmoreland County, Virginia
 Stratford Hall Plantation
 Central Rappahannock Regional Library
Westmoreland State Park

References

External links
 Westmoreland County Chamber of Commerce
 Westmoreland County Government
 Nomini Hall Slave Legacy Project: Chronicling the Descendants of the Slaves freed by Robert Carter III at Nomini Hall

 
Virginia counties
Virginia counties on the Potomac River
Northern Neck